Suillus plorans is an edible species of mushroom in the genus Suillus. The species was originally named Boletus plorans by Léon Louis Rolland before transferred to Suillus by Otto Kuntze in 1898. Although known as a predominantly European fungus, the species was recorded in Mexico in 1982.

References

External links

plorans
Fungi of Europe
Fungi of Mexico
Edible fungi
Fungi described in 1889
Fungi without expected TNC conservation status